Viktor Oliva (24 April 1861 – 5 April 1928) was a Czech painter and illustrator.

His most famous painting, Absinthe Drinker, is owned by Zlata Husa Gallery Prague and hangs there.

Life and work
Viktor Oliva was a master of drawing, illustration, and painting born in Nové Strašecí, Bohemia, Austria-Hungary 24 April 1861. His main style was Art Nouveau. At the age of 17 he attended the Academy of Fine Arts, Prague and studied under František Sequens, who respected his work greatly. He continued his studies at the Munich Academy.

In 1888 he was drawn to the Montmartre area of Paris to be part of the ever rapidly expanding artistic community there. He lived there for some years and became good friends with other "Bohemian Parisiens" such as Luděk Marold, Mikoláš Aleš, Jakub Arbes, and Karel Vítězslav Mašek. This group of actual Bohemians (from Bohemia) were right in the heart of the "Bohemian Revolution".

His art greatly improved in such a richly artistic environment. Paris is where he discovered the joy of absinthe. He also greatly loved the exhilaration of ballooning. This group all held very true to the ideals that the Artistic Bohemians believed in. They all lived and worked there for several years before returning to their home in true Bohemia.

In 1897 he was given the job of Images Editor at the popular Czech language magazine Zlatá Praha (Golden Prague). He held this job for 19 years. Shortly after he started work there, he married a girl named Anna Adamcová who was enamored with his talent. Not long after that, she gave birth to his son Viktor Oliva Jr. (who also was an aspiring artist). The marriage didn't last long, as Anna ran away with a singer named Mařák. Oliva was still able to spend some time with his son, which brought him much joy.

Over the next quarter century, Oliva was very prolific in his work. He spent a lot of time with his worldly best friend Josef Kořenský (a true world traveler at a time when this was difficult). Oliva was commissioned to create many dramatic works including the ceilings of several buildings in Bohemia. He also had several works hanging in his favorite cafe, Café Slavia (which still has his most famous work Piják absintu (Absinthe Drinker) hanging inside).

He was profiled in Český Svět magazine in 1926, two years before his death. Here is a translation of the text:

"Anniversary of the life (65th birthday) of such a kind and likable artist sets our memories well back – to the end of the 1880s – when the very young artist Oliva began to help with artistic decoration of Czech books with such an elegance and charm, that he soon became one of the most famous Czech illustrators up there with Luděk Marold, for example.

Oliva did illustrations for several books of Svatopluk Čech, Jan Neruda, Karel Václav Rais, Václav Beneš Třebízský, Kronbauer – those were published for almost two decades with his illustrations.

As a landscape and figure artist, huge canvases of Oliva hang in Café Slavia, the walls of buildings on Slavia Island, and Měšťanská Beseda in Plzeň.

He died on 5 April 1928 in Prague and was buried in Olšany Cemetery in an area for famous artists.

Opinions from the art world of the early 21st century 
According to an annotation from what is most likely the Troja Castle gallery in Prague:
 "The youngest artist at Troja is Viktor Oliva. He was primarily a graphic artist. His dust covers, book bindings and posters are among the best examples of Czech applied graphic art of the 1890s. In addition, however, he painted several ceilings and decorations for a number of Prague cafes. The entire work bespeaks the influence of French fin de siecle art, which is also a characteristic of Oliva's portraits."

According to the catalog of Czech art auction house Meissner-Neumann:
 "Czech painter and illustrator, he studied under F. Sequens at the Academy of Art in Prague, then in Munich and Paris. He was influenced by the work of his friend L. Marold. He created chiefly portraits and large-scale paintings following the historicizing stream in art. His portraits and large number of illustrations for books by Czech and European authors as well as his poster designs testify to the contemporary life style based on the Art Nouveau style."

Notable friends
Mikoláš Aleš, artist
Jakub Arbes. artist
Josef Kořenský, world traveler for whom Oliva illustrated books
Luděk Marold, artist
Karel Vítězslav Mašek, artist

References

External links

1861 births
1928 deaths
People from Rakovník District
People from the Kingdom of Bohemia
Czech painters
Czech male painters
Czech illustrators
Art Nouveau painters
Art Nouveau illustrators
Academy of Fine Arts, Munich alumni